Awana is an international evangelical Christian nonprofit organization in child and youth discipleship. The headquarters is in Streamwood, Illinois, United States.

History
In 1941, the children's program at the North Side Gospel Center in Chicago laid the foundation for the principles of Awana. Lance Latham, North Side's senior pastor, collaborated with the church's youth director, Art Rorheim, to develop weekly clubs that they believed would appeal to all children. Rorheim served as the CoFounder/President Emeritus until he died on January 5, 2018.

Other churches became interested in the program and inquired about its availability. In 1950, Latham and Rorheim founded Awana as a parachurch organization. The name is derived from the first letters of "Approved Workmen Are Not Ashamed" as taken from 2 Timothy 2:15. , Awana claims to work with over 61,000 churches in 122 countries.

Programs 
Awana offers resources and Bible-based training programs for children ages 2 to 18 in churches. Children will be encouraged, but not required, to memorize bible verses for credit or to redeem for small prizes.

Each Awana program is arranged into different groups that are separated by the ages and grades of the children attending. These groups include Puggles (ages 2 to 3), Cubbies (preschoolers, ages 4 to 5), Sparks (Kindergarten to 2nd Grade), T&T (Grades 3 to 6), Trek (Middle School), and Journey (High School). Although Awana offers programs for ages 2 to 18, churches that run an Awana program are not required to run a club for every age group.

See also
 Christian Service Brigade
 Pathfinders (Seventh-day Adventist)
 Royal Rangers
 Trail Life USA
 Child Evangelism Fellowship
 Child evangelism movement

References

External links
 
 
 
 Art Rorheim, Co-Founder/President Emeritus
 MinistryWatch - Awana Clubs International
 Charity Navigator Rating - Awana
 Awana Clubs International EIN 36-2428692 - ProPublica Nonprofit Explorer
 Awana Clubs International EIN 36-2428692 - Guidestar.org

Christian charities based in the United States
Christian organizations established in 1950
Christian organizations established in the 20th century
Evangelical parachurch organizations
1950 establishments in Illinois
Christian youth organizations
Charities based in Illinois
Youth organizations based in Illinois